Good Times! is the twelfth studio album by American pop rock band the Monkees. Produced mainly by Adam Schlesinger (with some additional bonus tracks produced by Andrew Sandoval), the album was recorded to commemorate the band's 50th anniversary. It is the first Monkees studio album since Justus (1996), marking the longest gap between Monkees albums to date, and the first since the death of founding member Davy Jones. The album features surviving Monkees Micky Dolenz, Michael Nesmith, and Peter Tork, as well as a posthumous contribution from Jones. The album received generally positive reviews from music critics and reached number 14 on the Billboard 200, becoming the band's highest-charting album in 48 years.

Background and recording
The project was initiated by Rhino executives John Hughes and Mark Pinkus, who were excited about a 50th anniversary album for the Monkees. Adam Schlesinger of Fountains of Wayne was hired to produce the album, with tracks by the three surviving Monkees, initially unreleased songs by the songwriters they used during their initial run including Neil Diamond, Carole King & Gerry Goffin, Harry Nilsson and Tommy Boyce & Bobby Hart and contemporary rock songwriters Schlesinger, Rivers Cuomo, Andy Partridge, Ben Gibbard, Noel Gallagher and Paul Weller. Schlesinger had asked his Fountains of Wayne bandmate Jody Porter to write a song for the album, but it was not used because it was too similar to the title track.

The title track was written by Harry Nilsson, and a surviving demo from the late 1960s was used incorporating Nilsson's vocals posthumously in a "duet" with Micky Dolenz. Davy Jones performs the Neil Diamond-penned track "Love to Love" which was recorded in 1967 for the Monkees' third album in a Don Kirshner-supervised session while the group was trying to gain musical independence from Kirshner. Once he was removed, the song was discarded in favor of recording an album of songs both sung and played by the group. The resultant album was Headquarters. The lead vocal track was re-recorded in 1969, but it never saw an official release, still unfinished, until the late 1970s. For its inclusion on Good Times!, the 1969 version is used with new backing vocals by Dolenz and Tork.

The first single from the album was "She Makes Me Laugh".  Penned by Weezer frontman Rivers Cuomo, it was released on April 28 along with a lyric video. The second new track to be released was "You Bring the Summer" written by Andy Partridge, which was debuted by DJ and Monkee-fan Iain Lee on his radio show on May 2, followed by it being made available by Rhino.

Musicians on the album include Fountains of Wayne members Schlesinger (guitar, bass, keyboards, drums, percussion), Porter (guitar) and Brian Young (drums, percussion), as well as Mike Viola (guitar, bass, background vocals) and Erik Paparozzi (bass on the bonus track "Love's What I Want"), and band members Micky Dolenz (vocals, drums), Michael Nesmith (vocals, guitar) and Peter Tork (vocals, keyboards, banjo).

Reception

The album has received generally positive reviews, including a 4 out of 5 review by The Independent, who declared that Good Times! was "probably The Monkees' best album, after their hits compilation", while The New York Times summed up the release with "Fifty years later, the Monkees are still endearing." The Herald-Standard concluded that "If indeed this latest album serves as the group’s swan song, then it is a joyous finale." Music magazine Mojo gave the album four stars, and declared it their album of the week, while Record Collector stated "to everyone’s considerable relief and delight, they’ve pulled it off. They really have," and gave the album four stars.

The album was awarded 3.5 out of 5 by Rolling Stone, who concluded "Monkees freaks have waited far too long for this album. But it was worth it." The album was even better received by the magazine's Australian edition, which gave it full marks and noted "Producer Adam Schlesinger of Fountains Of Wayne knows a thing or five about classic pop, and although Good Times! is a Frankenstein's monster of something old, something new and something in between, he manages to orchestrate the whole thing into something beyond an embarrassing heritage act."

Ultimate Classic Rock declared that "The fact that there is a new Monkees album in 2016 is miraculous enough, but that said album, Good Times!, is nothing short of a masterpiece is astounding." The RTÉ website also gave the album a positive review, stating that "keeping it analogue and raw, Good Times! is a joy. This is one band reunion that doesn’t besmirch the legacy and even offers something new and fresh." However, it acknowledged that "Noel Gallagher teams up with Paul Weller to dash off 'Birth Of An Accidental Hipster', another droll sub-Kinks ditty but it sounds bloated compared to the effervescence of what’s gone before." ABC News concluded that "This is mandatory listening for any Monkees fan." Stephen Thomas Erlewine of AllMusic gave the album 4 out of 5 stars, stating the album is "a joyous revival of the cheerful jangle that characterized the group's big '60s hits."

A slightly more mixed review was given by Will Hodgkinson in The Times, who gave the album 3/5, and the Evening Standard, who decided that the album "doesn’t quite work as it’s let down by a flat production and the lack of anything approaching their more magical moments. For all that, though, it’s no disgrace" and gave the album three stars.

A negative review was given by The Irish Times, with Tony Clayton-Lea summarizing that "Songs by Death Cab for Cutie songwriter Ben Gibbard ("Me & Magdalena"), XTC's Andy Partridge ("You Bring The Summer"), and Noel Gallagher/Paul Weller ("Birth of an Accidental Hipster") brilliantly reference the band's 1960s glory days, but as a cohesive project it's more unpleasant valley Sunday than anything else."

At Metacritic, the album has a metascore of 79, indicating generally favorable reviews. Its user score is 8.7, indicating universal acclaim.

The album is the highest charting Monkees album in the US since The Birds, The Bees & The Monkees in 1968 and the highest charting in the UK since Pisces, Aquarius, Capricorn & Jones Ltd. in 1967.

Accolades

Track listing

Personnel and session information
All tracks produced by Adam Schlesinger unless otherwise noted

"Good Times"
Micky Dolenz – lead vocals
Harry Nilsson - lead vocals, piano
Michael Nesmith - guitar
Adam Schlesinger - guitar
Rick Dey - bass
Eddie Hoh - drums
Recorded: January 10, 1968, and Lucy's Meat Market, Los Angeles, February 2016

"You Bring the Summer"
Micky Dolenz - lead vocals
Michael Nesmith - guitar, backing vocals
Peter Tork - organ, backing vocals
Mike Viola - guitar
Pete Min - guitar
Jody Porter - guitar
Adam Schlesinger - bass, keyboards
Brian Young - drums, percussion
Recorded at Lucy's Meat Market, Los Angeles, February - March 2016

"She Makes Me Laugh"
Micky Dolenz - lead vocals
Peter Tork - banjo, backing vocals
Michael Nesmith - guitar, backing vocals
Mike Viola - guitar
Adam Schlesinger - bass
Brian Young - drums, percussion
Recorded at Lucy's Meat Market, Los Angeles, February 2016
Dolenz wasn't comfortable with some of the original lyrics as written by Rivers Cuomo. The lyric "directing traffic in the mall" was improvised by Dolenz, and Cuomo "added in new lyrics about Scrabble and a canoe trip when Dolenz felt the original draft was geared towards a man much younger than his 71 years."

"Our Own World"
Micky Dolenz - lead vocals
Peter Tork - keyboards, backing vocals
Michael Nesmith - backing vocals
Adam Schlesinger - guitar, bass, keyboards
Brian Young - drums, percussion
Recorded at Lucy's Meat Market, Los Angeles, February 2016

"Gotta Give It Time"
Micky Dolenz - lead vocals
Michael Nesmith - backing vocals
Al Gorgoni - guitar
Don Thomas - guitar
Hugh McCracken - guitar
Lou Mauro - bass
Artie Butler - organ
Herb Lovelle - drums
Tom Cerone - tambourine
Jeff Barry - original producer, original arrangement
Adam Schlesinger - reproducer
Ray Hall - original engineer
Leftover from the final Kirshner supervised sessions in January 1967. However no vocals were recorded at the time.
Recorded at RCA Studio B, New York City, January 21 (11:00 AM – 7:00 PM) and 24, 1967, and Lucy's Meat Market, Los Angeles, February 2016

"Me & Magdalena"
Michael Nesmith - lead vocals
Micky Dolenz - harmony vocals
Mike Viola - guitar, bass
Jody Porter - guitar
Adam Schlesinger - piano, drums
Recorded at Lucy's Meat Market, Los Angeles, February - March 2016

"Whatever's Right"
Micky Dolenz - lead vocals
Michael Nesmith - backing vocals
Peter Tork - keyboards
Mike Viola - guitar
Adam Schlesinger - bass
Brian Young - drums
Coco Dolenz - backing vocals
Bobby Hart - organ/backing vocals
Originally recorded during the sessions for More of the Monkees but no tapes of the original recording have been found. It is unknown whether any Monkee vocals were ever recorded for the original version.
Recorded at Lucy's Meat Market, Los Angeles, February - March 2016

"Love to Love"
Davy Jones - lead vocals
Peter Tork - backing vocals
Micky Dolenz - backing vocals
Al Gorgoni - guitar
Don Thomas - guitar
Hugh McCracken - guitar
Lou Mauro - bass
Artie Butler - organ
Herb Lovelle - drums
Tom Cerone - tambourine
Jeff Barry - original producer, original arrangement
Adam Schlesinger - reproducer
Ray Hall - original engineer
Originally recorded in 1967 for the group's third album (which would become Headquarters), the vocal track was re-recorded by Jones in 1969 for The Monkees Present, but left unreleased until Missing Links Volume Three. In 2016, Micky Dolenz and Peter Tork contributed new backing vocals to the 1969 version for inclusion on this album. The original vocal track recorded in 1967 was eventually released on the 2007 re-release of Headquarters. That makes this version unique in that the instrumental track was recorded in 1967, the lead vocal track in 1969, and backing vocal track in 2016, making this song a combination of three different time periods.
Slightly different mixes featuring a vocal track by Jones from the same recording session in 1969 was featured on the track's inclusion for Monkeemania (40 Timeless Hits), Monkee Business, Missing Links Volume Three, Music Box, and previously on a bonus disc on The Definitive Monkees.
Recorded at RCA Studio B, New York City, January 21 (11:00 A.M. - 7:00 P.M.) and 24, and February 4 and 5, 1967, and August 5, 1969, and Lucy's Meat Market, Los Angeles, February 2016

"Little Girl"
Peter Tork - lead vocals, acoustic guitar
Mike Viola - guitar, backing vocals
Adam Schlesinger - bass
Brian Young - drums
Tork notes in the Good Times! CD booklet that he wrote this song with Davy Jones in mind, and had hoped Jones would've sung it.
The track should not be confused with another Monkees song "Little Girl" from The Monkees Present which was written by Micky Dolenz.
Recorded at Lucy's Meat Market, Los Angeles, February 2016

"Birth of an Accidental Hipster"
Michael Nesmith - lead vocals
Micky Dolenz - co-lead vocals
Coco Dolenz - backing vocals
Mike Viola - guitar
Adam Schlesinger - bass, piano, percussion
Brian Young - drums
Recorded at Lucy's Meat Market, Los Angeles, February - March 2016

"Wasn't Born to Follow"
Peter Tork - lead vocals, banjo
Mike Deasy - guitar
Dennis Budimir - guitar
Al Casey - guitar
Max Bennett - bass
Michael Melvoin - harpsichord
Earl Palmer - drums
Stan Leavey - percussion
Milt Holland - vibes
Originally produced by The Monkees
Originally started during the sessions for The Birds, The Bees & The Monkees but previously unfinished or unreleased.
Recorded at RCA Victor Studios, Hollywood, March 9, 1968, and Lucy's Meat Market, Los Angeles, February 2016

"I Know What I Know"
Michael Nesmith - lead vocals 
Adam Schlesinger - piano, bass, guitar, Chamberlin

"I Was There (And I'm Told I Had a Good Time)"
Micky Dolenz - lead vocals, drums
Adam Schlesinger - piano, bass
Mike Viola - guitar
Recorded at Lucy's Meat Market, Los Angeles, February - March 2016

Bonus tracks
"Me & Magdalena" (Version 2)
Michael Nesmith - lead vocals, guitar
Micky Dolenz - harmony vocals
Mike Viola - guitar
Adam Schlesinger - bass, organ
Brian Young - drums
Recorded and mixed at Lucy's Meat Market, Los Angeles, CA, February 2016
Additional recording and mixing at Omelette Station, NYC, and The Pool, North Hollywood, CA

"Terrifying"
Micky Dolenz - lead vocals
Michael Nesmith - guitar
Peter Tork - keyboards
Mike Viola - guitar, backing vocals
Adam Schlesinger - bass, guitar
Brian Young - drums
Recorded and mixed at Lucy's Meat Market, Los Angeles, CA, February 2016
Additional recording and mixing at Omelette Station, NYC, and The Pool, North Hollywood, CA

"Love's What I Want"
Micky Dolenz - lead vocals
Andrew Sandoval - acoustic six-string & electric 12-string guitars, backing vocals, drums, handclaps
Coco Dolenz - backing vocals
Erik Paparozzi - bass, electric guitar, backing vocals, handclaps
Bobby Hart - organ, handclaps
Pete Thomas - drums, percussion, handclaps
Produced by Andrew Sandoval
Recorded at Lucy's Meat Market, Los Angeles, March 2016
Additional recording at Picture Studios, Los Feliz, CA

"A Better World"
Peter Tork - lead vocals, guitar, percussion
Micky Dolenz - backing vocals
Coco Dolenz - backing vocals
Joe Boyle - lead guitar, bass, backing vocals
Sturgis Cunningham - drums, percussion, backing vocals
Katlin Wolfberg, Corinne Olson, Emily Elkins, Eliza James - strings
Produced by Peter Tork and Andrew Sandoval
Basic track recorded at Studio Wormwood, Mansfield Center, CT, March 2016
Additional recording at Lucy's Meat Market, March 2016

Charts

References

2016 albums
The Monkees albums
Rhino Records albums
Albums produced by Adam Schlesinger
Albums produced by Andrew Sandoval